The Vichada Structure is a probable impact structure along the Vichada River in Colombia (Vichada Department), South America.  It is most likely the largest impact structure in South America.

The structure was discovered in 2004 by Max Rocca, a geologist in Buenos Aires, by examining Landsat imagery.  He was supported by a grant from the Planetary Society.  The structure consists of a central flat depression surrounded by two concentric rings of hills of approximately 30 and 50 km diameter.  The Vichada River anomalously flows around the outer ring of hills.  An international team of scientists collected aerial gravity data over the 50 km wide structure and discovered a positive free-air anomaly at the center of the structure, supporting its interpretation as an impact structure.

See also
 List of impact craters in South America
 List of possible impact structures on Earth

References

Impact craters of Colombia